Forrest Goodluck (born August 6, 1998) is an American actor. He is best known for playing Hugh Glass's son Hawk in the 2015 film The Revenant, and for his supporting role as Adam Red Eagle, a two-spirit teenager sent to a conversion therapy camp, in the 2018 British-American film The Miseducation of Cameron Post. Goodluck most recently guest-starred in the Netflix miniseries,  The Liberator, which was released on Veterans Day, November 11, 2020.

Early life
A Native American, Goodluck was born in Albuquerque, New Mexico. His father, Kevin, is Navajo. His mother Laurie's ancestry includes Hidatsa, Mandan, Navajo, and Tsimshian.

Career
Goodluck's first acting experience was during a sixth grade production of A Charlie Brown Christmas at his elementary school: later he performed in stage and theater productions in middle and high school. At age 13, he auditioned for Native American director Chris Eyre's film Man Called Buffalo, which never made it to production, but did allow him to network with future casting directors. He starred as Saul Indian Horse in the 2012 drama Indian Horse about the dark history of Canadian boarding schools and the aboriginal people. 

Goodluck auditioned for the part of Hawk in the 2015 film The Revenant when he was 15 years old. The Revenant was his first feature film role. Goodluck won Best Performance in a Feature Film – Supporting Young Actor (14–21) at the 37th Young Artist Awards for his role as Hawk.

In February 2016, he was cast to appear in a pilot for the Hulu drama Citizen as Guero, a "wiry graduate of the streets who serves as the charismatic and bipolar leader of a group called 'Baby Narcos. In November 2016, it was announced Goodluck would star opposite Chloë Grace Moretz and Sasha Lane in The Miseducation of Cameron Post.

Filmography

Film

Television

Video games

Awards and nominations

References

External links 
 
 

1998 births
Living people
21st-century American male actors
21st-century Native Americans
Native American actors
American male film actors
American male television actors
Male actors from Albuquerque, New Mexico
Native American male actors
Navajo people
Tsimshian people